The Vancouver Film Critics Circle Award for Best Supporting Actress in a Canadian Film is an annual award given by the Vancouver Film Critics Circle.

Winners

2000s

2010s

2020s

References

Supporting Actress in a Canadian Film
Film awards for supporting actress